The Schlitz Hotel is a former hotel and saloon in Winona, Minnesota, United States.  It operated from 1892 to 1921 as one of many such establishments commissioned around the Upper Midwest by the Joseph Schlitz Brewing Company of Milwaukee.  The building was listed on the National Register of Historic Places in 1982 for its local significance in the themes of architecture and commerce.   It was nominated for being a well-preserved example of this once-common business venture by breweries.  In 1998 the Schlitz Hotel was also included as a contributing property of the Winona Commercial Historic District.

See also
 National Register of Historic Places listings in Winona County, Minnesota

References

External links
 

1892 establishments in Minnesota
1921 disestablishments in Minnesota
Buildings and structures in Winona, Minnesota
Defunct hotels in Minnesota
Drinking establishments on the National Register of Historic Places in Minnesota
Hotel buildings completed in 1892
Hotel buildings on the National Register of Historic Places in Minnesota
Individually listed contributing properties to historic districts on the National Register in Minnesota
National Register of Historic Places in Winona County, Minnesota